Christine Schuberth (born 1944) is an Austrian film and television actress.

Selected filmography
 Hot Pavements of Cologne (1967)
 Take Off Your Clothes, Doll (1968)
 Hugo, the Woman Chaser (1969)
 King, Queen, Knave (1972)
 Sunshine Reggae in Ibiza (1983)
 Ein Schloß am Wörthersee (1990–1993, TV series)

References

Bibliography
 Gerard Garrett. The films of David Niven. LSP Books, 1975.

External links

1944 births
Living people
Actresses from Vienna
Austrian film actresses
Austrian television actresses
20th-century Austrian actresses
21st-century Austrian actresses